Siah Manseh, also rendered as Seyah Muneseh or Siah Muneseh or Siah Munseh, may refer to:
 Siah Manseh-ye Bala
 Siah Manseh-ye Pain